Marguč is a Slovene-language surname. Notable people with the surname include:

Gašper Marguč (born 1990), Slovenian handball player
Rok Marguč (born 1986), Slovenian snowboarder

Slovene-language surnames